The 1926 All-Ireland Senior Football Championship Final was the 39th All-Ireland Final and the deciding match of the 1926 All-Ireland Senior Football Championship, an inter-county Gaelic football tournament for the top teams in Ireland.

Final
A last-minute goal by Bill Gorman (Kerry) forced a draw. After the game, Kerry's centre back Jack Murphy put his clothes back on without taking off his playing gear, and died of pneumonia before the replay.

Replay
The Kingdom (Kerry) won the replay with a Tom O'Mahoney goal.

It was the second of three All-Ireland football titles won by Kerry in the 1920s, which made them joint "team of the decade" with Dublin who also won three.

References

All-Ireland Senior Football Championship Final
All-Ireland Senior Football Championship Final, 1927
All-Ireland Senior Football Championship Finals
Kerry county football team matches
Kildare county football team matches